Patera clenchi (syn. Mesodon clenchi) is a species of land snail in the family Polygyridae. It is endemic to Arkansas in the United States. Its common names include Calico Rock oval, Clench's middle-toothed land snail, and Mission Creek Oregonian.

The snail occurs in leaf litter in rocky cliff and rockslide habitat. It is threatened by habitat disturbance.

The species was named for the American malacologist William J. Clench.

References

Polygyridae
Endemic fauna of Arkansas
Molluscs of the United States
Gastropods described in 1932
Taxonomy articles created by Polbot
Taxobox binomials not recognized by IUCN